The East Germany women's national volleyball team was the national team of East Germany. It was governed by the Deutscher Sportverband Volleyball der DDR (GDR German Volleyball Association) and took part in international volleyball competitions until it was disbanded in 1990 following German reunification and incorporated into United Germany national team.

Team record

Olympic Games results

 1976 — 6th Place
 1980 —  2nd Place
 1988 — 5th Place

World Championship
 Champions   Runners Up   Third Place   Fourth Place

FIVB Volleyball World Cup

 1989 — 5th Place

European Championship
 Champions   Runners Up   Third Place   Fourth Place

Team

1986 World Championship squad

Managers

References

External links
Official website
FIVB profile

National women's volleyball teams
Volleyball in East Germany
National sports teams of East Germany